Mount Metschel is a prominent ice-free mountain in Antarctica,  high, standing  southeast of Angino Buttress and the Skelton Icefalls. It was mapped by the United States Geological Survey from ground surveys and Navy air photos, and was named by the Advisory Committee on Antarctic Names for Commander John J. Metschel, U.S. Navy, commander of the icebreaker  in the Antarctic and the Arctic in 1962 and 1963. Metschel was killed in the Arctic, 15 October 1963, while engaged in ice reconnaissance in a helicopter from his ship.

References

Mountains of Oates Land